Louis Aubert, called le Fils, (15 May 1720, Paris – c. 1800) was an 18th-century French painter and composer, active from 1740 to 1780. The violinist and composer Jacques Aubert was his father and Abbé Aubert (1731–1814) his brother.

Works

Instrumental 
1750: Sonates à Violon seul avec la Basse continue
1758: Six Symphonies à quatre, trois Violons obligés, avec Basse continue,

Paintings 
 La Leçon de lecture, huile sur bois, 323 x 227 mm, 1740, Amiens, musée de Picardie
 Intérieur avec jeune femme pelotant la laine, graphite pencil, black chalk, chalk and colored chalk, pen and gray ink, 315 x 226 mm, 1746, Rijksmuseum Amsterdam
 Les Deux Artistes, 1747, Albertina, Vienna

References

Bibliography 
 Neil Jeffares, The Dictionary of pastellists before 1800, London, Unicorn Press, 2006

External links 

 Louis Aubert on Arcadja

French male classical composers
French Baroque composers
18th-century French male classical violinists
1720 births
Painters from Paris
Musicians from Paris
1800s deaths
18th-century French painters
French male painters
18th-century classical composers
18th-century French composers
17th-century male musicians
18th-century French male artists